Klaudia Maruszewska (born 28 August 1997) is a Polish track and field athlete who competes in the javelin throw. She won the gold medal at the 2016 World Junior Championships with a personal best of 57.59 metres.

Competition record

References

External links

1997 births
Living people
Polish female javelin throwers
Place of birth missing (living people)
21st-century Polish women